Ann Meyer (born 1965) is an American politician and nurse serving as a member of the Iowa House of Representatives from the 8th district. Elected in November 2018, she assumed office on January 14, 2019.

Early life and education 
Meyer was born in Redford, Michigan in 1965. She earned a Bachelor of Science degree in nursing from the University of Detroit Mercy.

Career 
Outside of politics, Meyer works as a nurse. She has also been a nursing instructor at Iowa Central Community College. Meyer was elected to the Iowa House of Representatives in November 2018 and assumed office on January 14, 2019. Meyer also serves as chair of the House Human Resources Committee.

References 

1965 births
Living people
People from Redford, Michigan
People from Fort Dodge, Iowa
American nurses
Republican Party members of the Iowa House of Representatives
Women state legislators in Iowa
University of Detroit Mercy alumni
21st-century American women